The Republican Socialist Party (abbreviated PSR) was a political party in Belgium. The party was founded on August 15, 1887, by Alfred Defuissaux, a miners' leader from Borinage. Defuissaux had been expelled from the Belgian Labour Party in February 1887, as the party tried to distance itself from militant strikes such as those of 1886. The new party was mainly based in the Wallonia-Hainaut areas. The party, whose followers were generally miners, argued in favour of a grève noire ('black strike', i.e., a complete general strike) as a means to obtain universal suffrage or, possibly, integration with republican France.  The year it was founded, the PSR led a wave of local strikes.

The first PSR party congress was held on December 25, 1887, in Châtelet. The congress adopted a party programme and statues.

In December 1888 several leading figures of the PSR were arrested, a blow that the party would not recuperate from. Through the legal proceedings that followed in 1889, information emerged that most of the PSR leadership were in fact agent provocateurs on the government's payroll. The influence of the party waned as a result of these revelations. The scandal became known as le Grand Complot (the Great Complot). The events of le Grand Complot were reenacted in a 1990 theatre play by the same name by Jean Louvet.

The party began publishing La Bataille in 1889, its publication continued until 1891 (as a Republican Socialist weekly).

At the time of the centenary of the French Revolution of 1789, PSR merged back into the Belgian Labour Party. The PSR, albeit short-lived, represented the sole effort to build a structured republican political organization in Belgium.

References

Defunct socialist parties in Belgium
Political parties established in 1887
Political parties disestablished in 1889
Republicanism in Belgium
19th century in Belgium
1887 establishments in Belgium